Honorary Ambassador of the Republic of Kosovo is the title given to foreign citizens and citizens originating from Kosovo, who have contributed to the national interest of Kosovo, and use their fame to help the recognition of the independence of Kosovo.

List of Ambassadors

References

Orders, decorations, and medals of Kosovo

External links
Article about Dr. Otto von Feigenblatt as Honorary Ambassador of Kosovo